Rayman is a video game franchise created by French video game designer Michel Ancel.

The term may also refer to:

Fictional:
Rayman (video game), the first video game in the series
People:
Marcel Rajman (1923−1944), a Polish Jew, volunteer in a group of French resistance fighters, also known as Marcel Rayman
Will Rayman (born 1997) American-Israeli basketball player for Hapoel Haifa in the Israeli Basketball Premier League

Germanic-language surnames